Wilzenberg-Hußweiler (or Wilzenberg-Hussweiler) is an Ortsgemeinde – a municipality belonging to a Verbandsgemeinde, a kind of collective municipality – in the Birkenfeld district in Rhineland-Palatinate, Germany. It belongs to the Verbandsgemeinde of Birkenfeld, whose seat is in the like-named town.

Geography

Location
This double municipality, consisting of the Ortsteile of Wilzenberg and Hußweiler, lies on the Schwollbach at the edge of the Schwarzwälder Hochwald (forest) in the Hunsrück. The municipal area is 52.6% wooded.

Neighbouring municipalities
Wilzenberg-Hußweiler borders in the north on the municipality of Siesbach, in the northeast on the municipality of Rötsweiler-Nockenthal, in the east on the municipality of Oberbrombach, in the south on the municipality of Niederbrombach, in the southwest on the municipality of Niederhambach, in the west on the municipality of Schwollen and in the northwest on the municipality of Leisel.

History
In 1344, Hußweiler had its first documentary mention, while Wilzenberg was first mentioned in 1438. Both places belonged to the “Hinder” County of Sponheim. After the Congress of Vienna, both Hußweiler and Wilzenberg became part of the Principality of Birkenfeld, an exclave of the Grand Duchy of Oldenburg, most of whose territory was in what is now northwest Germany, with a coastline on the North Sea. In the course of administrative restructuring in Oldenburg under the Nazis, Wilzenberg and Hußweiler were amalgamated into one municipality on 22 September 1933.

Politics

Municipal council
The council is made up of 8 council members, who were elected by majority vote at the municipal election held on 7 June 2009, and the honorary mayor as chairman.

Mayor
Wilzenberg-Hußweiler’s mayor is Joachim Jung.

Coat of arms
The municipality’s arms might be described thus: Per pale argent and vert an oaktree fructed eradicated counterchanged, the chief countercompony gules and argent.

Culture and sightseeing

Buildings
The following are listed buildings or sites in Rhineland-Palatinate’s Directory of Cultural Monuments:

Hußweiler
 Hußweilerstraße 30 – stately Quereinhaus (a combination residential and commercial house divided for these two purposes down the middle, perpendicularly to the street), partly timber-frame, partly slated, half-hipped roof, marked 1822; in the back barn additions

Wilzenberg
 Auf der Dry 3 – former smithy; one-floor building with gable roof, possibly from the 20th century; technical equipment

Economy and infrastructure

Transport
Running to the southeast of the municipality is Bundesstraße 41, which towards the south leads to the Autobahn A 62 (Kaiserslautern–Trier). Serving nearby Kronweiler is a railway station on the Nahe Valley Railway (Bingen–Saarbrücken).

References

External links
 Wilzenberg-Hußweiler in the collective municipality’s webpages 
 Brief portrait of Wilzenberg-Hußweiler in SWR Fernsehen programme Hierzuland 

Birkenfeld (district)